Leah Letson (born August 21, 1992) is a retired American female mixed martial artist who competed in the Featherweight divisions of the Ultimate Fighting Championship. She reached a career-best ranking of #9 at Women's Featherweight on Fight Matrix on January 7, 2017.

Early life and career 
Leah Letson was born on 21 August 1992 in Wisconsin, United States. Letson started martial arts at 5, earning her 2nd degree Karate black belt at age 11, and her 3rd Degree Taekwondo black belt at 14. Letson moved to Milwaukee to attend the University of Wisconsin–Milwaukee where she started kickboxing, then on the advice of her coaches Brazilian jiu-jitsu (BJJ). While at UWM Letson enlisted in the Air National Guard in 2012 and after completing basic training she started training MMA.
On November 9, 2013, she won her first MMA amateur fight, a year later she had her first pro fight.

Mixed martial arts career

Early career 
After losing her debut via split decision against Chrsitina Jobe at KOTC: Industrial Strength on November 22, 2014, Letson won her next 4 bouts, knocking out Shaena Cox in the second round, defeating Allanna Jones via unanimous decision, stopping Sarah Payan via TKO in the first round, culminating with a victory at Invicta FC 21, where Letson faced UFC veteran Elizabeth Phillips, knocking her out with a headkick in the first round.

The Ultimate Fighter 
In 2018, Letson was a contestant on The Ultimate Fighter: Heavy Hitters. She was the fourth pick for Team Whittaker. Letson won the quarterfinal bout against Bea Malecki by unanimous decision.

In the semi-finals, Letson faced Macy Chiasson. She lost the bout by way of knockout in round one.
In January 2018 the UFC offered her a contract.

Ultimate Fighting Championship 
Letson made her UFC debut at the Ultimate Fighter finale, beating Julija Stoliarenko via split decision.

Letson was scheduled to face Sarah Moras on May 4, 2019, at UFC Fight Night 151. However, Letson was removed from the fight in early April for an unspecified medical issue and replaced by Macy Chiasson.

Letson faced  Felicia Spencer on November 13, 2021, at UFC Fight Night 197. She lost the fight via technical knockout in round three.

Letson was scheduled to face UFC newcomer Chelsea Chandler on October 1, 2022, at UFC Fight Night: Dern vs. Yan in a women's bantamweight bout. However, Letson pulled out in late August due to personal reasons and was replaced by Julija Stoliarenko.

On January 9, 2023, Letson announced she was retiring from MMA due to losing love for the sport and its taxing nature.

Mixed martial arts record 

|-
|Loss
|align=center|5–2
|Felicia Spencer
|TKO (elbows and punches)
|UFC Fight Night: Holloway vs. Rodríguez
|
|align=center|3
|align=center|4:25
|Las Vegas, Nevada, United States
|
|-
|Win
|align=center|5–1
|Julija Stoliarenko
|Decision (split)
|The Ultimate Fighter: Heavy Hitters Finale
|
|align=center|3
|align=center|5:00
|Las Vegas, Nevada, United States
|
|-
|Win
|align=center|4–1
|Elizabeth Phillips
|KO (head kick)
|Invicta FC 21: Anderson vs. Tweet
|January 14, 2017
|align=center|1
|align=center|1:18
|Kansas City, Missouri, United States
|
|-
|Win
|align=center|3–1
|Sarah Payant
|TKO (punches)
|Premier FC 20
|
|align=center|1
|align=center|4:22
|Springfield, Massachusetts, United States
|
|-
|Win
|align=center|2–1
|Allanna Jones
|Decision (unanimous)
|KOTC: Blood Enemies
|
|align=center|3
|align=center|5:00
|Washington, Pennsylvania, United States
|
|-
|Win
|align=center|1–1
|Shaena Cox
|KO (punch)
|Pure FC 2
|
|align=center|2
|align=center|0:50
|Milwaukee, Wisconsin, United States
|
|-
|Loss
|align=center|0–1
|Christina Jobe
|Decision (split)
|KOTC: Industrial Strength
|
|align=center|3
|align=center|5:00
|Carlton, Minnesota, United States
|

Mixed martial arts exhibition record 

|-
|Loss
|align=center|1–1
|Macy Chiasson
|KO (knees to the body)
| rowspan=2| The Ultimate Fighter: Heavy Hitters
| (airdate)
|align=center|1
|align=center|3:04
| rowspan=2|Las Vegas, Nevada, United States
|
|-
|Win
|align=center|1–0
|Bea Malecki
|Decision (unanimous)
| (airdate)
|align=center|2
| align=center|5:00
|

Personal life 
In 2016 Letson graduated with degrees in psychology and in criminal justice with a minor in sociology.

See also 
 List of female mixed martial artists

References

External links 
 

Living people
American female mixed martial artists
Featherweight mixed martial artists
Mixed martial artists utilizing taekwondo
Mixed martial artists utilizing karate
Mixed martial artists utilizing Brazilian jiu-jitsu
Ultimate Fighting Championship female fighters
American female taekwondo practitioners
American female karateka
American practitioners of Brazilian jiu-jitsu
Female Brazilian jiu-jitsu practitioners
Sportspeople from Wisconsin
1992 births